Pa Pitt, originally "Father Pitt", has been a personification of the city of Pittsburgh, Pennsylvania since the 1890s. Numerous editorial cartoonists have depicted "Pa Pitt" over the years, notably Pittsburgh Post-Gazette cartoonist Cy Hungerford.

A 1906 article by Raymond Gros lists seven cartoonists who had already drawn a 'Father Pitt', including Fred Johnston of the Leader whom Gros credits as creating 'Father Pitt' in 1897 to replace an earlier personification, 'Miss Pittsburgh'. Historian J. Cutler Andrews credited a different Leader journalist, Arthur G. Burgoyne, with creating the character. Burgoyne himself claimed that "On November 5, 1895, Father Pitt was born. He was my offspring."

References

External links
 "Who is Pa Pitt?" (includes links to artwork by several cartoonists)
 Original "Father Pitt" cartoon by Johnston

Civic personifications
Culture of Pittsburgh